KCAL-FM (96.7 FM) is a commercial radio station that is licensed to Redlands, California, and broadcasts to the Inland Empire (Riverside—San Bernardino) area. The station is owned by Anaheim Broadcasting and airs an active rock format. The KCAL-FM studios are located in Redlands and the transmitter site is near Lake Arrowhead in the San Bernardino Mountains.

History
KCAL-FM first signed on in 1965 with a middle of the road (MOR) format. Originally owned by Southwest Broadcasting Company, it was the sister station of KCAL (1410 AM).

In 1969, KCAL-FM adopted a dayparted rock format, playing soft rock during daytime hours and harder album rock at night. This hybrid format, known as "The Rock Spectrum", was unique in the Inland Empire radio market. A prominent feature on KCAL-FM was a weekly program called Album Premiere, during which a newly released album was played Monday and Tuesday evenings — one side each evening. This eventually led to a switch to album-oriented rock (AOR) full-time in 1978.

In October 1986, Southwest Broadcasting sold KCAL-FM to San Bernardino Broadcasting, headed by Tim Sullivan, for $4 million; KCAL (AM) remained with Southwest. On January 1, 1987, control of the station passed to Anaheim Broadcasting, also led by Sullivan; that March, the new owner installed former KGGI program director Cliff Roberts in the same position at KCAL-FM.

During the 1990s, KCAL-FM adjusted its AOR format to active rock, mixing newer hard rock songs with classic rock.

In the late 1990s, the station began hosting a listener appreciation party known as the "KCAL Kegger". Held in the station's parking lot in Redlands three times a year, each party features live rock bands, local vendors, refreshments, and a beer garden; the station donated proceeds from beer sales to local charities. Each year's final Kegger includes a bikini pageant called "Miss KCAL".

On December 31, 2014, high winds in the San Bernardino Mountains toppled KCAL-FM's transmission tower, knocking the station off the air. The station resumed broadcasting two days later on the evening of January 2, 2015, attaching its transmission equipment to KFRG's tower temporarily.

In January 2018, longtime KCAL-FM on-air personalities Michael "Stu-Man" Stewart, "Tiffany" Angelo, and James "Jimbo" Smith — the morning drive hosts collectively known as "STJ", and previously known as "The Morning Stiffy" — were dismissed from the station due to budget cuts. Morning show producer Steven Kono was also let go. Patrick Tish took over morning host duties.

References

External links

CAL-FM
Active rock radio stations in the United States
Mass media in the Inland Empire
Redlands, California
Mass media in Riverside, California
Mass media in San Bernardino, California
Mass media in Riverside County, California
Mass media in San Bernardino County, California
Radio stations established in 1965
1965 establishments in California